The Battle of Wolgast was an engagement in the Thirty Years' War, fought on 22 August (O.S.) or 2 September (N.S.) 1628 near Wolgast, Duchy of Pomerania, Germany.

Danish forces of Christian IV of Denmark-Norway had made landfall on Usedom and the adjacent mainland, and expelled the imperial occupation forces. An Imperial army commanded by Albrecht von Wallenstein left besieged Stralsund to confront Christian IV. Ultimately, the Danish forces were defeated. Christian IV and a fraction of his landing force were able to escape by ship.

Prelude

Christian IV of Denmark-Norway had started the Danish-Norwegian intervention in the Thirty Years' War by invading the Holy Roman Empire in 1625. Initially successful, he suffered setbacks when his armies were defeated in the battles of Dessau Bridge and Lutter am Barenberge in 1626. In the following months, the Danish armies were forced to abandon their gains on Imperial soil and parts of Denmark herself, and retreated to the Danish isles while the Imperial army of Albrecht von Wallenstein subsequently occupied the North German plain.

The Duchy of Pomerania, which included Wolgast, capitulated to the Empire at Franzburg in November 1627. The Baltic Sea, however, remained under Danish control, due to the lack of an imperial navy. The Emperor Ferdinand II gave Wallenstein the Duchy of Mecklenburg in January, and promoted him "General of the Oceanic and Baltic Seas" in April 1628. Together with Spain, Wallenstein made plans for a Baltic imperial navy. Denmark and Sweden reacted by concluding an alliance, also in April. The Pomeranian port of Stralsund, some 70 kilometers west of Wolgast, refused to accept the Capitulation of Franzburg and with Danish and Swedish support successfully resisted Wallenstein's siege. In addition to the support for Stralsund, Christian IV had resorted to a strategy of amphibious ambushes, using his naval superiority to make landfalls on Fehmarn and in Eckernförde, and destroying the naval facilities in Ålborg, Greifswald, and Wismar - all in imperial hands.

Battle

On 11 August, Christian IV of Denmark-Norway with 7,000 troops landed on Usedom, separated from the town of Wolgast by the Peenestrom sound, and occupied the island. At the mouth of the sound, the Imperial occupation forces since February had constructed a sconce at Peenemünde, which was taken by Christian IV's troops.

On 14 August (O.S.)/24 August (N.S.), they took over Wolgast meeting no resistance. After the Imperial garrison was expelled, Christian IV was met by an overwhelming support of the local population to turn Wolgast into a fortress like Stralsund. Reinforcements were on their way from Sweden.

Christian IV then awaited Wallenstein, who withdrew from the siege of Stralsund and was heading east to face the Danish force. The battlefield Christian had chosen was half a mile west of the town, secured by the coast and marshes.

Christian IV had 5,000-6,000 troops on the battlefield, including 1,500 cavalry and some 400 Scots from the Donald Mackay regiment, and the infantry organized in six regiments. Wallenstein advanced with a force of 7,000-8,000 troops, consisting of 33 infantry companies, 20 cuirassier companies, and 11 guns.

Wallenstein attacked on 22 August (O.S.) / 2 September (N.S.). He wiped out the Danish flank, killing 1,000 of Christian IV's troops and capturing another 600. Thereafter, he was able to retake the town, where 500 Danish troops were now isolated from the main army and had no choice but to surrender. Thereby, Wolgast with its residence of the Pomeranian dukes was badly burned and looted. Only nightfall allowed for Christian IV and some of his troops to retreat and board their vessels.

Aftermath

Analysis
The battle was the last one between Christian IV and the Holy Roman Empire. The defeat at Wolgast, ending the most ambitious operation of the Danish 1628 amphibious assault series, was the decisive factor that led Christian IV to negotiate the Peace of Lübeck with Ferdinand II, Holy Roman Emperor. On the other hand, Wallenstein also needed a peace: The campaigns of Christian IV succeeded to keep Imperial forces busy that were needed elsewhere, and with respect to Denmark, this was a major intent behind the assaults. Furthermore, the Dano-Swedish alliance that took shape was a threat to Wallenstein's North German gains.

After Albrecht von Wallenstein had lost much of his reputation in the Siege of Stralsund, the victory at Wolgast postponed his dismissal. Though Ferdinand II had Ramboldo, Count of Collalto, reduce Wallenstein's army, the passage about his dismissal was stricken out.

Peace of Lübeck

The Peace of Lübeck then basically returned to Christian IV his pre-war possessions, while he had to pledge not to intervene in the empire again.

Sweden invades Pomerania

In 1630, Gustavus Adolphus of Sweden started the Swedish invasion of the Holy Roman Empire, landing on Usedom near Wolgast - in the same spot as Christian IV did before. The Imperial defenders of Wolgast, in charge since the battle of 1628, were defeated on 7 August 1630 in the town, and on 25 August in the castle of Wolgast. While his success was longer lasting, he would return to Wolgast on 15 July 1633 in a casket, when his body was embarked for the final transfer to Sweden.

See also
List of battles
Thirty Years' War
Capitulation of Franzburg
Siege of Stralsund (1628)
Pomerania during the Early Modern Age

Notes

Sources

References

Bibliography

Battles involving Denmark
Battles involving the Holy Roman Empire
Battles of the Thirty Years' War
Conflicts in 1628
1628 in Denmark
Albrecht von Wallenstein